Methyl caffeate is an ester of caffeic acid, a naturally occurring phenolic compound. It is an α-glucosidase inhibitor. Its physical form is a powder.

Natural occurrences 
Methyl caffeate can be found in the fruit of Solanum torvum.

Health effect 
Methyl caffeate shows an antidiabetic effect in streptozotocin-induced diabetic rats.

References 

O-methylated hydroxycinnamic acids
Hydroxycinnamic acid esters
Vinylogous carboxylic acids
Catechols